East Pennant  is a rural community on the Chebucto Peninsula in the Halifax Regional Municipality Nova Scotia on the shore of the Atlantic Ocean on the East Pennant Road off of Route 349.

Communications
Telephone exchange 902 - 868 
 First three digits of postal code - B3V

References

External links
Explore HRM

Communities in Halifax, Nova Scotia
General Service Areas in Nova Scotia